The Canadian International School (CIS) is an international school in Singapore with a campus at Lakeside. CIS operates under International Baccalaureate Primary (IB PYP), Middle Years (IB MYP) and Diploma (IB DP) programmes. The school accepts students from Nursery to Grade 12.

History
This School was established in 1990 as a university preparatory day school and was named the Canadian Overseas College, but subsequently changed its name to the Canadian International School.

Today, CIS is a full programme International Baccalaureate (IB) school in Singapore housing children in nursery to grade 12). Programmes include Chinese-English and French-English bilingual programmes, STEAM and Open Minds
 
The Tanjong Katong Campus will close in June 2023, and students enrolled there will transfer to Lakeside in August 2023.

Construction of a new Junior Wing and sporting facilities will open in January 2023.

In June 2020, China Maple Leaf Educational Systems Ltd acquired CIS in a deal valued at S$680 million.

CIS curriculum and faculty

Language Programme
CIS's academic programme is delivered in three pathways: English, Chinese-English bilingual and French-English bilingual (primary school only). 
In the English programme, students can select an additional language and language choices are:
Chinese, French, or Spanish (Spanish offered in Secondary only)

Faculty
The school website says over 77% of its teachers hold multiple degrees or postgraduate qualifications.

Bilingual Programme Singapore 
The school provides two bilingual programmes. The Chinese-English bilingual programme is provided to children in nursery to grade 6, with pathways for the Chinese-English bilingual programme in grades 7-12. The French-English programme is offered for children in senior kindergarten to grade 6. The programme sees children immersed in both languages 50% of the time.

Campuses

Tanjong Katong Campus 
The Tanjong Katong Campus was opened in September 2007 on the former site of the Tanjong Katong Girls' School. Block C of the Tanjong Katong campus is a Singapore Heritage listed site.

Angela Henderson is the current principal of the campus.

This campus will close in June 2023. Students enrolled at this campus will transfer to the Lakeside campus in August 2023.

Jurong West Campus 
The Lakeside campus is set on 43,000 sq.m. of land, provides students with facilities that include classrooms connected to learning pods, academic facilities, sporting, outdoor and playground facilities, as well as a performing and fine arts centre, 500-seat theatre, Olympic-sized swimming pool and junior pool, maker spaces and a two-storey library. It also features a 2,600-sqm outdoor learning play area called the Outdoor Discovery Centre that includes sand and water areas to support play-based learning.

Colleen Drisner is the current kindergarten and primary school principal.

Daniel Smith is the secondary school principal.

See also

 Canada–Singapore relations

References

International schools in Singapore
Bukit Merah
Bukit Timah
Canada–Singapore relations
Canadian international schools in Singapore
Schools in Central Region, Singapore
Educational institutions established in 1989
1989 establishments in Singapore